Joseph N. Chambers (1798–1874) was an American politician and army officer. Chambers was born in Maryland and graduated in 1818 from the United States Military Academy. He then served as a lieutenant until his resignation in 1823. He was later elected as a Member of the House of Representatives of Louisiana. Chambers died on November 12, 1874, in Clinton, Louisiana.

Military career
He was appointed from his home state of Maryland as Cadet at the United States Military Academy on January 1, 1814, and graduated June 24, 1818. He served in the Army from 1818 to 1823  as Second and First Lieutenant and resigned on November 6, 1823.

References

19th-century American politicians
19th-century American military personnel
People from Maryland
United States Military Academy alumni
Date of birth missing
Members of the Louisiana House of Representatives
United States Army officers
1798 births
1874 deaths